Chiu Lut Sau Memorial Secondary School (趙聿修紀念中學), or CLSMSS in short, is a secondary school in Yuen Long, Hong Kong. It was founded in 1979. It is a Band 1 school and is one of the 14 Government schools approved for using English as the medium of instruction (EMI) for all levels.

The school is to provide students with a balanced education aimed at excellence in moral, intellectual, physical, interpersonal and aesthetic development and at fulfillment of the school motto – Wisdom, Virtue, Honesty and Progress, whereby they can achieve self-actualization in all respects throughout their lives and as leaders of tomorrow.

Principals

Lut Sau Hall
Lut Sau Hall is the official school hall of the school. In the past, it was also used as a local community hall for cultural performances. In early 2000s, the state of community hall was ended after the opening of Yuen Long Theatre near the school. The hall was renovated in 2016.

Class system
Before the New Senior Secondary Curriculum (NSS Curriculum) was imposed in 2012, the school provided both secondary education and matriculation. For Form 1 – 5, there were 5 classes (A – E) in each form. For Form 6 – 7, there were 2 classes (A and S) in each form. 'A' stands for Arts stream while 'S' stands for Science stream.

Currently, there are approximately 150 students in each year from Secondary 1 to Secondary 6 . Students are streamed into 4 classes A, B, C, D according to their academic performance, with A and B being the better classes in junior form (S.1 – S.3). In Senior form, there would be 4 classes A, B, C, D according to the preferences of students in choosing the electives.  Remedial lessons are also arranged to give support to less capable students.

Medium of instruction
Except Chinese subjects, cultural subjects and Civic Education and Liberal Studies, English is used in learning and teaching in all subjects.

Subjects
Secondary 1–2:
English Language, Chinese Language, Mathematics, Life and Society, Integrated Science, Integrated Humanities, Chinese History, Putonghua, Physical Education, Computer Literacy, Music, Visual Arts, Design and Technology, Home Economics

Secondary 3:
English Language, Chinese Language, Mathematics, Life and Society, Physics, Chemistry, Biology, Geography, History, Chinese History, Physical Education, Computer Literacy, Music, Visual Arts

Secondary 4:

Core subjects: English Language, Chinese Language, Mathematics, Citizen and Social Development, Physical Education

Physical Education

Electives: Physics, Chemistry, Biology, Chinese History, History, Mathematics Module 2, Business Accounting and Financial Studies, Information and Communications Technology, Chinese Literature, Visual Arts, Music, Geography, Economics

Secondary 5–6:

Core subjects: English Language, Chinese Language, Mathematics, Liberal Studies/Citizen and Social Development, Physical Education

Electives: Physics, Chemistry, Biology, Chinese History, History, Mathematics Module 2, Business Accounting and Financial Studies, Information and Communications Technology, Chinese Literature, Visual Arts, Geography, Economics

Students' union
A popular election is held every school year in the first school term. All students are eligible to vote. Generally, each student can vote by secret ballot for one proposed cabinet.

House system
There are four houses, comprising members of all the classes in the school. The houses are named Wisdom, Virtue, Honesty and Progress. The houses compete against each other in the annual Swimming Gala, Athletics Meet, Inter-house Singing Contest and Inter-house Drama Competition.

House colours
Wisdom – Red
Virtue – Yellow
Honesty – Blue
Progress – Green

Notable alumni

 Joe Ma Tak-chung:  a famous Hong Kong TVB actor
 Margaret Kan Pui Kin: a Hong Kong artist. She was the winner of Miss Hong Kong 2010 and the representative of Hong Kong of Miss World 2010.

References

External links
 Official Website of Chiu Lut Sau Memorial Secondary School
 Official Website of the Alumni's Union of Chiu Lut Sau Memorial Secondary School 
 Official Website of the Parents' and Teachers' Association (PTA) of Chiu Lut Sau Memorial Secondary School
 Photo Gallery of Chiu Lut Sau Memorial Secondary School

Secondary schools in Hong Kong
Educational institutions established in 1979
Yuen Long
1979 establishments in Hong Kong